Thulin is a surname of Swedish origin and may refer to:

People
Camilla Thulin (born 1961), Swedish fashion designer
Einar Thulin (1896–1963), Swedish high jumper
Enoch Thulin (1881–1919), Swedish aircraft engineer, founder of AB Thulinverken
Hans-Christian Thulin (born 1977), Swedish actor
Ingrid Thulin (1926–2004), Swedish actress
Jonathan Thulin (born 1988), Swedish singer
Lars Uno Thulin (1939–2002), Norwegian engineer, civil servant and politician
Mats Thulin (born 1948), Swedish botanist
Ron Thulin, American sportscaster
Vera Thulin (1893–1974), Swedish swimmer
Willy Thulin (1889–1967), Swedish diver

Other
12379 Thulin, a minor planet
Thulin aircraft, including a list of planes made by Swedish company AB Thulinverken
Thulin A (automobile), built by Enoch Thulins Aeroplanfabrik, 1920–1925
Thulin B (automobile), built by AB Thulinverken, 1926–1927
Thulin, Wallonia, a district of the municipality of Hensies, Belgium